Edward Heavey (October 13, 1928 – September 27, 2019) was an American lawyer and politician who served as a member of the King County Council, representing the 8ty district from 1969 to 1976. A member of the Democratic Party, 
he previously served as a member of the Washington House of Representatives, representing the 31st district from 1967 to 1969.

References

King County Councillors
2019 deaths
1928 births
Democratic Party members of the Washington House of Representatives
20th-century American politicians